Zaur Ramazanov (born 27 July 1976) is a retired Azerbaijani international footballer who played as a striker.

Career

Club
Ramazanov was top scorer in Azerbaijan Premier League season 2004–05, 2006–07.

International
Ramazanov made 14 appearances for the Azerbaijan national football team.

Personal life
Zaur is the elder brother of fellow Azerbaijan international footballer Aghabala.

Career statistics

International

Statistics accurate as of match played 4 June 2008

Honours

Club
Khazar Lankaran
Azerbaijan Premier League (1): 2006/07
Azerbaijan Cup (2): 2006–07, 2007/08
CIS Cup (1): 2008

Individual

Azerbaijan Premier League Top Scorer (2): 2004–05, 2006–07

References

External links
Player profile at qarabagh.com

1976 births
Living people
Azerbaijani footballers
Azerbaijan international footballers
Qarabağ FK players
Khazar Lankaran FK players
MOIK Baku players
Azerbaijan Premier League players
Footballers from Baku
Association football forwards